"Concentrated" is Fear Zero's second studio release. The EP was released in 2005 under the label Satch Records.

Track listing 

 "Beautiful Scars" - 5:35
 "Porno Nation" - 3:50
 "Alone By The Ocean" - 3:57
 "Fine For The First Time" - 3:56
 "Day Of Our Last Night" - 3:37
 "Beautiful Scars" (Radio Edit) - 4:04

References

Concentrated
2005 EPs